Samuelsson is a Swedish patronymic surname meaning "son of Samuel".  There are alternative spellings such as the English Samuelson and the Norwegian Samuelsen.  It is uncommon as a given name.  Samuelsson may refer to:

 Bengt I. Samuelsson (born 1934), Swedish biochemist
 Evelina Samuelsson (born 1984), Swedish ice hockey player
 Guðjón Samúelsson (1887–1950), Icelandic architect
 Gunnar Samuelsson (1927–2007), Swedish cross-country skier
 Håkan Samuelsson (born 1951), Swedish businessman
 Henrik Samuelsson (born 1994), Swedish-American ice hockey player
 Kalle Samuelsson (born 1986), Swedish bandy player
 Kjell Samuelsson (born 1958), Swedish ice hockey player
 Magnus Samuelsson (born 1969), Swedish actor, "World's Strongest Man"
 Magnus Samuelsson (footballer, born 1971), Swedish footballer
 Magnus Samuelsson (footballer, born 1972), Swedish footballer
 Marcus Samuelsson (born 1970), Swedish chef and restaurant owner
 Martin Samuelsson (born 1982), Swedish ice hockey player
 Mattias Samuelsson (born 2000), American ice hockey player
 Mikael Samuelsson (born 1976), Swedish ice hockey player
 Philip Samuelsson (born 1991), Swedish-American ice hockey player
 Sebastian Samuelsson (born 1997), Swedish biathlete
 Tommy Samuelsson (born 1960), Swedish ice hockey player
 Ulf Samuelsson (born 1964), Swedish ice hockey player

See also
 Samuels
 Samuelsen
 Samuelson

Swedish-language surnames
Patronymic surnames
Surnames from given names